The men's 400 metres hurdles event at the 2015 Military World Games was held on 4 and 6 October at the KAFAC Sports Complex.

Records
Prior to this competition, the existing world and CISM record were as follows:

Schedule

Medalists

Results

Round 1
Qualification: First 2 in each heat (Q) and next 2 fastest (q) qualified for the final.

Final

References

400 metres hurdles